may refer to:

 Snow Moon Flowers, a Japanese topic in art and design borrowed from Ancient China
 Setsugekka, a resort train operated by the Echigo Tokimeki Railway in Japan
 "Setsu Getsu Ka", a 1998 song by Japanese singer Shizuka Kudo
 "Setsugekka (The End of Silence)/Zan", a 2009 single by the Japanese singer Gackt
 "Setsugetsuka" (song), a 2018 song from Uta no Prince-sama: Shining Live